Vértesacsa (also Vértes-Acsa) is a village in Fejér County, Hungary, near the city of Székesfehérvár (25 km to the north).

External links 

 Street map 

Populated places in Fejér County
Hungarian German communities